Morgan Mahanya (born 30 June 1948) is a Zimbabwean Shona-language writer of detective fiction and war fiction. He has published 13 books since 1976, including books in Shona and in English, both fiction and nonfiction. Mahanya is one of the pioneering writers of detective stories in the Shona language. His books Chidamwoyo, Zvinoyera and The Wound are about the Rhodesian Bush War.

Background
Morgan Mahanya was born at Zimuto Mission in Masvingo Province in a ChiShona-speaking family. His father Nicholas, who died in 1966, was the headman in Mahanya Village, Zimuto. Mahanya went to Mutatiri for primary school and Zimuto Mission for secondary school before joining Mambo Press as a shorytories freelance writer and contributor in 1972. He worked for the now defunct Moto Magazine in the 1970s. Mahanya also taught at Sherwood Primary School near Kwekwe from 1968 to 1970.

His first book published was Rufu Runobereka Rufu (Death begets death). He has since written 13 books, two of them in the English language.

Mahanya's novels have been used in several dissertations and theses.

Mahanya was a Sidakeni/Empress Mine ward councillor and the Mashambazhou Council chairman in the former Mashambazhou District Council from 1982 to 1991. He also was one of the five commissioners in the amalgamation of Kwekwe Rural Council and Mashambazhou District Council forming the Zibagwe Rural District Council in 1991-1993.

Works
Mahanya has written 13 books, 11 of them in Shona.

 The Wound. . English. Publisher: Gweru, Zimbabwe: Mambo Press, 1991. Series: Dandaro Readers.
 Takunda and Chipo in Storyland Forest: a tale of old and modern Zimbabwe. 90 pages. , . Juvenile audience. Language: English. Publisher: Gweru, Zimbabwe: Mambo Press, 1993. Series: Dandaro Readers.
 Chinotanga Mberi mashura. , . Language: Shona. Publisher: Gweru, Zimbabwe: Mambo Press, 1985.
 Chidamwoyo. 42 pages.  , . Library of Congress: PL8681.9.M25 C5 1983. Language: Shona. Publisher: Gweru, Zimbabwe: Mambo Press in association with the Literature Bureau, 1983.
 Munzwa Mundove. 160 pages. . Language: Shona. Publisher: Harare, Zimbabwe: College Press, 1999.
 Rufu Runobereka Rufu. Fiction. Language: Shona. Publisher: Salisbury: Longman Rhodesia, 18 October 1976.
 Zvinoyera. 167 pages. , . Fiction. Language: Shona. Publisher: Gweru: Mambo Press, 1989.
 Matsvamwoyo. . Fiction. Language: Shona. Publisher: Harare: College Press, 1992.
 Mazvokuda Maronda Enyora. Fiction. Language: Shona. Publisher: Salisbury: Rhodesia Literature Bureau, 1978.
 Muroyi Royera Kure. 16 pages. Fiction. Language: Shona. Publisher: Salisbury: Rhodesia Literature Bureau, 1978.
 Ndomene Haichemedzi. Language: Shona. Publisher: Salisbury: Literature Bureau, 1980.
 Hapana Chinodyiwa Chisina Muzorera.
 Hondo yechimurenga. Mambo Press. A collection from various authors.

Awards and recognition

 Munzwa Mundove is one of the African Language Vernacular Materials in UCLA Libraries: Shona.
 Munzwa Mundove, Chinotanga Mberi Mashura and Rufu Runobereka Rufu are school set books, for secondary schools in the Shona language examinations. Rufu Runobereka Rufu was the main set book in the Zimbabwe Schools Examinations Councils Shona Language Examination of Monday, 1 November 2004. Chinotanga Mberi Mashura was the main set book for the same language in the 2016 June session.
 Mahanya's book Zvinoyera was runner-up in the Shona category of the 1991 Zimbabwe Literary Awards.
Chidamwoyo is listed among Zimbabwe drama and plays since 1958.
 Chidamwoyo and Rufu Runobereka Rufu are in the George Fortune Collection (George A. Smathers Libraries, University of Florida).

Personal life

Mahanya is married to Rebecca and has four daughters. The last-born, Grace, is a budding novelist. He lives a humble life in Zhombe, Empress Mine Ward in a village called Totororo.

See also

 Totororo Secondary School

References

Zimbabwean novelists
Zimbabwean male writers
Male novelists
Zimbabwean male short story writers
Zimbabwean short story writers
Zimbabwean children's writers
Living people
1948 births
20th-century novelists
20th-century male writers